Aeonium aureum is a species of flowering plant in the family Crassulaceae, native to the Canary Islands (Tenerife, Gran Canaria, El Hierro, La Gomera and La Palma). It has very short stems, usually with several leaf rosettes. The grey-green leaves are tightly packed and fleshy.

References

aureum
Flora of the Canary Islands
Plants described in 1819